Numenius of Heraclea (Nouménios ho Hērakléōtēs) is ancient Greek physician and poet, dated to the end of the 4th century BC. According to Athenaeus, he was a pupil of the physician Dieuches.

The author is registered in the TLG Canon as tlg0703.

Works
Numenius wrote didactic poems on a range of topics, including:
 Ἁλιευτικόν/Halieutikón, "On Fishing"
 Θηριακόν/Thēriakón, "On theriac"
 a work on medicinal prescriptions
 Δείπνων ἀναγραφαί/Deípnōn anagraphaí, "Records of Banquets"

References

Bibliography 
 H. Diller. s.v. Numenius (7a). RE Suppl. 7. 663-664
 S. Fornaro. "Numenius" (1). Brill's New Pauly
 E. Kaczyńska. "The Cretan Origin of Numenius Heracleotes in the Light of Ancient Greek Dialectology". Κρητικά Χρονικά 23 (2013), 35-43 
 

4th-century BC Greek physicians
Ancient Greek poets